Cox may refer to:

 Cox (surname), including people with the name

Companies 
 Cox Enterprises, a media and communications company
 Cox Communications, cable provider
 Cox Media Group, a company that owns television and radio stations
 Cox Automotive, an Atlanta-based business unit of Cox Enterprises
 Cox Models, aka Cox Hobbies
 Cox Sports, a regional sports network that served the United States New England region until 2012

Places

Antarctica
 Cox Glacier
 Cox Nunatak
 Cox Peaks
 Cox Point
 Cox Reef

United States
 Cox, Florida 
 Cox, Missouri
 Cox College (Georgia), a defunct private women's college located in College Park, Georgia
 Cox College (Missouri), a private college in Springfield, Missouri
 Cox Furniture Store, c. 1890, a historic site in Gainesville, Florida 
 Cox Furniture Warehouse, a historic site in Gainesville, Florida 
 Cox Run, a tributary of Little Muncy Creek in Lycoming County, Pennsylvania
 Cox site

Elsewhere
 Cox Island, Canada
 Cox, Haute-Garonne, France
 Cox, Alicante, Spain
 Cox Peninsula, Australia

Science and technology
 Cyclooxygenase, an enzyme
 Cytochrome c oxidase, an enzyme
 COX, oxide capacitance in MOSFET devices
 Cox model, a proportional hazards model in statistics
 Cox model engines, made by L.M. Cox Manufacturing Inc. and later Cox Hobbies
 Cox process, a point process in probability theory

Other uses
 abbreviation of coxswain (rowing), a member of a boat crew
 Cox's Orange Pippin, a variety of apple also known as Cox in Britain
 an abbreviation of Cox's Criminal Cases, British law reports
 Cox (novel), a 2016 novel by Christoph Ransmayr

See also
 Cox & Kings, a travel agency derived from two firms of regimental agents in British India
 Cox Bluff (disambiguation)
 Cox Center (disambiguation)
 Cox Creek (disambiguation)
 Cox Green (disambiguation)
 Cox House (disambiguation)
 Cox Lake (disambiguation)
 Cox River (disambiguation)
 Cox Town (disambiguation)
 Cox's, a former department store in Pittsburgh, Pennsylvania, United States
 Cox's Road (disambiguation)
 Cock (disambiguation)